Yanajirca or Yana Hirka (Quechua yana black, Ancash Quechua hirka mountain, "black mountain", also spelled Yanajirca)  is a mountain in the Andes of Peru which reaches an altitude of approximately . It is located in the Ancash Region, Bolognesi Province, on the border of the districts of Huallanca and Huasta. Yana Hirka lies east of Wamash Mach'ay.

References 

Mountains of Peru
Mountains of Ancash Region